The World Figure Skating Championships is an annual figure skating competition sanctioned by the International Skating Union in which figure skaters compete for the title of World Champion.

The 1948 competitions for men, ladies, and pair skating took place from February 11 to 15 in Davos, Switzerland. These were the second World Figure Skating Championships after World War II. Skaters from Germany and Japan were still not allowed to compete.

Results

Men

Judges:
 Adolf Rosdol 
 A. Voordeckers 
 Melville F. Rogers 
 Vladimir Koudelka 
 H. Meistrup 
 Hubert M. Martineau 
 Marcel Vadas 
 H. Storke 
 E. Kirchhofer

Ladies

Judges:
 Hans Meixner 
 Melville F. Rogers 
 K. Zemek 
 Georges Torchon 
 Kenneth M. Beaumont 
 Elemér Terták 
 H. Meistrup 
 M. Bernard Fox 
 A. Winkler

Pairs

Judges:
 Rudolf Kaler 
 A. Voordeckers 
 Melville F. Rogers 
 Vladimir Koudelka 
 Georges Torchon 
 Mollie Phillips 
 Marcel Vadas 
 Harold G. Storke 
 James Koch

Sources
 Result List provided by the ISU

World Figure Skating Championships
World Figure Skating Championships
World Figure Skating Championships
International figure skating competitions hosted by Switzerland
Sport in Davos
World Figure Skating Championships